Visitors to Serbia must obtain a visa from one of the Serbian diplomatic missions unless they come from one of the visa exempt countries.

The Government of Serbia, based on bilateral agreements or unilateral decisions, allows citizens of certain countries and territories to visit Serbia for tourism or business purposes without having to obtain a visa. Citizens of other countries have to obtain a visa from the Embassy or Consulate General of the Republic of Serbia in the country of their principal residence.

Visa policy of Serbia is similar to the visa policy of the Schengen Area. Serbia grants visa-free entry to most Schengen Annex II nationalities, except for Brunei, El Salvador, Guatemala, Honduras, Kiribati, Malaysia, Mauritius, Marshall Islands, Micronesia, Nicaragua, Panama, Samoa, Saint Lucia, Solomon Islands, Timor-Leste, Tonga, Taiwan, Tuvalu, Vanuatu and Venezuela.  It also grants visa-free entry to several additional countries – Armenia, Azerbaijan, Bahrain, Belarus, China, Cuba, Indonesia, Jamaica, Kazakhstan, Kuwait, Kyrgyzstan, Mongolia, Oman, Qatar, Russia, Suriname and Turkey.

Visa policy map

Visa-free access
Citizens and holders of ordinary passports of the following 91 countries and territories can enter and stay in Serbia without a visa:

Notes
 For longer stays a residence permit application must be made through the Ministry of Interior.
 Including all classes of British nationality.
 May enter on a national ID card for a stay of up to 90 days within 180 days.
 90 days within a six-month period for holders of passports endorsed for public affairs.
 Maximum stay is calculated within any 180 days unless stipulated otherwise by a bilateral agreement.

Substitute visas
As of November 2014 valid visa holders and residents of the European Union and Schengen Area member states and the United States can enter Serbia without a visa for a maximum stay of 90 days within 180 days, provided the visa remains valid for the entire length of stay.

Reciprocity

Serbian citizens can enter most of the countries whose citizens are granted visa-free access to Serbia without a visa except for Antigua and Barbuda (grants electronic visa), Australia (grants electronic visa), Bahamas, Bahrain, Bolivia (grants visa on arrival), Burundi (grants visa on arrival), Canada, Guinea-Bissau (grants electronic visa and visa on arrival), Ireland, Jamaica (grants visa on arrival), Kuwait (grants visa on arrival), Mexico, New Zealand, Palau (grants visa on arrival), Paraguay, United Kingdom and the United States.

Diplomatic and official passports
Additionally, only holders of diplomatic and official passports of the following countries do not require visas for Serbia for visits up to 90 days (unless otherwise noted):

 and  signed an agreement of abolishing visas for diplomatic and service passports on 10th of December 2018.
 and  signed an agreement of abolishing visas for diplomatic and service passports on 26th of March 2019.
 and  signed an agreement of abolishing visas for diplomatic and service passports on 29th of March 2019.
 and  signed an agreement of abolishing visas for diplomatic and service passports on 9th of January 2020.
 and  signed an agreement of abolishing visas for diplomatic and service passports on 3rd of February 2022.
 and  signed an agreement of abolishing visas for diplomatic and service passports on 10th of February 2022.
 and  signed an agreement of abolishing visas for diplomatic and service passports on 28th of March 2022.
 and  signed an agreement of abolishing visas for diplomatic and service passports on 25th of May 2022.
 and  signed an agreement of abolishing visas for diplomatic and service passports on 6th of July 2022.
 and  signed an agreement of abolishing visas for diplomatic and service passports on 8th of July 2022.
 and  signed an agreement of abolishing visas for diplomatic and service passports on 20th of July 2022.
 and  signed an agreement of abolishing visas for diplomatic and service passports on 28th of July 2022.
 and  signed an agreement of abolishing visas for diplomatic and service passports on 29th of July 2022.
 and  signed an agreement of abolishing visas for diplomatic and service passports on 21st of September 2022. 
 and  signed an agreement of abolishing visas for diplomatic and service passports on 23rd of September 2022. 
 and  signed an agreement of abolishing visas for diplomatic and service passports on 16th of January 2023.

Recent and future changes

In June 2014, a plan was announced to sign further bilateral agreements on visa liberalization with important trading partners. In May 2015 the list of countries for visa liberalisation was announced — Qatar, Kuwait, Oman, Bahrain, Venezuela, Panama, Jamaica, Colombia, Paraguay and Guatemala. Second phase should include Armenia, Azerbaijan and Malaysia. In December 2016 it was announced that Serbia plans to remove visa requirements for ordinary passport holders of Armenia, Azerbaijan and Georgia. In August, October and December 2017, the Serbian Government unilaterally removed the visa requirements for the passport holders of Iran, India, Indonesia, Guinea-Bissau and Suriname. In February 2018, Serbia lifted the visa requirement for nationals of Bahamas, Barbados, Colombia, Jamaica, Saint Vincent and the Grenadines and Paraguay. On 9 March 2018 Serbian Government unilaterally abolished visas for Georgian citizens before the ratification of the bilateral agreement. On 2 June 2018 Serbia unilaterally abolished visas for the citizens of Azerbaijan and Burundi. In October 2018, Government of Serbia rescinded its previous decision on visa-free entry for citizens of Iran. In January 2019, Serbia lifted the visa requirement for nationals of Palau and Saint Kitts and Nevis. In October 2019 Serbia abolished visa requirements for nationals of Armenia.

A visa waiver agreement was signed with Vanuatu in November 2019 and it is yet to enter into force.

Faced with the EU pressure due to the increased number of asylum seekers in the EU member states coming from the territory of Serbia, as well as the obligation to which Serbia, as a candidate country, is committed in the negotiations with the EU, to align its visa requirements with the Schengen visa requirements, the visa-free access has been unilaterally abolished for citizens of Tunisia, Burundi, India, and Guinea-Bissau.

General entry requirements for Serbia

The following are general entry requirements for Serbia:
 Valid passport/travel document;
 Valid visa in the passport, if a Serbian visa is required for passport holders of the respective country;
 Proof of sufficient funds for staying in Serbia. Sufficient funds are considered to be 50 euros per day of stay, proved by possession of the appropriate amount of cash, bank statement, traveler's cheques, credit cards or a letter of guarantee;
 Certificate of vaccination or a note that he/she has not contracted a contagious disease despite coming from an area affected by a pandemic, as defined by the information of the Ministry of Health.
 If underage children are traveling with one of their parents, it is necessary to submit a relevant certified authorization by the other parent; or if the child is traveling with a third person such authorization is required from both parents or guardian;
 It is recommended to have a health insurance for the period of stay in Serbia, covering possible medical costs to the amount of not less than 20,000 euros.

Visa requirements

Requirements for tourist / business visa
Tourist visa entitles its holder only for tourism trip and visit of relatives and/or friends. Tourist visa holders are prohibited to engage in business or work activities in Serbia.

General visa requirements:

Valid passport (passport must be valid at least 90 days from issue date of visa)
Letter of invitation:
 for a private visit – invitation letter certified by the relevant authority of the Republic of Serbia
 for a business visit – invitation letter by a company in Serbia;
 for a tourist trip – a proof of payment for the trip issued by a travel agency (voucher or other type of payment receipt);
 Completed visa application form: (PDF);
 Photo (size 3.5x4.5 cm);
 Return ticket or Itinerary (copy of Driving License and Insurance if you travel by car);
 Proof of sufficient funds for staying in Serbia;
 Health insurance
 Visa fee.

Visa applications should be submitted to the Embassy or Consulate General of the Republic of Serbia abroad.

For the issuance of a transit visa, you should have an entry visa for the country you are entering after the Republic of Serbia. In case a visa is not required for that country, you will be asked to present other documents explaining the purpose of your visit there.

Diplomatic-consular mission of the Republic of Serbia reserves the right to request additional documentation. Incomplete applications will not be accepted.

For more information regarding the issuance of visa, please contact the nearest diplomatic-consular mission of the Republic of Serbia.

Requirements for temporary residence visa / work visa
Anyone wishing to live and work in Serbia will be required to apply for a temporary residence permit (for nationals requiring a visa, a temporary residence visa has to be obtained before entry). To obtain a temporary visa for employment purposes, you will need to secure a job offer from a Serbian company or government department, or a foreign company based in Serbia. The criteria for approval of an employment visa include suitable educational qualifications or work experience, a secured employment contract in Serbia, proof of adequate means of subsistence in Serbia, police confirmation that you have no criminal record, and a satisfactory medical examination. All official documents must be translated into Serbian.

Requirements for permanent residence
Permanent residency in Serbia can be acquired after five years of temporary residency, three years of temporary residency if married to a Serbian citizen and on special grounds.

Obligatory registration
If foreign travelers stay at a hotel, hostel or other commercial accommodation during their visit to Serbia, they are not required to register with the police, since the accommodation will complete the registration on their behalf and issue a receipt confirming it (if not automatically issued, the traveler should request it).
When staying in a private accommodation, the owner of the apartment/house must register the foreigner with the police station of the precinct in which the residence is located (alternatively, the owner can issue a written authorization in advance through a notary for the foreigner to register him/herself). within 24 hours of the foreigner entering the country. The process involves filling in an online form (also available at major police stations) which is signed and stamped by a police officer. Visitors should safeguard this form during the stay in the country, as it may be checked by police inside the country and/or when exiting Serbia. Failing to complete the registration may result in a RSD 5000-150000 fine (also for the accommodation provider/host), imprisonment and/or deportation.

Kosovo
Inhabitants of Kosovo, who can prove their Serbian citizenship, can apply for a Serbian passport, which is issued by the Serbian Coordination Directorate. Holders of these passports require a visa for the EU.

Until 2008, UNMIK issued travel documents These documents were recognized by several countries, but is in general refused at borders. It was possible to hold both the Serbian as well as the UNMIK travel document. Serbia did not recognize the validity of the UN issued document.

Since 2008, the government of Kosovo has issued its own passports, superseding the UNMIK travel document. Kosovar passports are not recognised for travel by Serbia unlike the Kosovo ID cards that can be used to enter Serbia.

Visitor statistics
Most visitors arriving to Serbia for tourism (counting only guests in tourist accommodation establishments) were from the following countries of nationality:

See also

Visa requirements for Serbian citizens
Visa policy of the Schengen Area
Visa policy of Kosovo

References

External links
 Ministry of Foreign Affairs  of Serbia 

Serbia
Foreign relations of Serbia